David Neil O'Halloran (8 September 1955 – 11 April 2013) was an Australian rules footballer who played with Hawthorn in the Victorian Football League (VFL).

Recruited from Ivanhoe Grammar School, O'Halloran debuted for Hawthorn in 1976 as a defender and was a premiership player  that year. Nicknamed "Rubber", O'Halloran won another premiership with Hawthorn in 1983 and after being on the losing grand final team two years later he left Hawthorn, finishing with 160 games. A Victorian representative in interstate football, O'Halloran was selected in the 1982 'Team of the Year' by the VFL.

Death
Married with two children, O'Halloran died from a heart attack while cycling on 11 April 2013 at age 57.

References

External links

1955 births
2013 deaths
Hawthorn Football Club players
Hawthorn Football Club Premiership players
Australian rules footballers from Victoria (Australia)
Place of birth missing
Place of death missing
Two-time VFL/AFL Premiership players
People educated at Ivanhoe Grammar School